Aechmea distichantha, the Brazilian vaseplant, or vase plant, is a bromeliad typical of Cerrado vegetation in Brazil, which is also native to northern Argentina, Bolivia, Paraguay, and Uruguay.  This plant is often used as an ornamental plant.

The following varieties are recognized:
 Aechmea distichantha var. distichantha  - Brazil, Argentina, Paraguay, Uruguay
 Aechmea distichantha var. glaziovii  (Baker) L.B.Sm.(1943)  - southeastern Brazil
 Aechmea distichantha var. schlumbergeri  E.Morren ex Mez (1892)  - Bolivia, Brazil, Argentina, Paraguay
 Aechmea distichantha var. vernicosa  E.Pereira (1979)  - Rio de Janeiro State

Cultivars
 Aechmea 'Chantichantha'
 Aechmea 'Dawson'
 Aechmea 'Distibachii'
 Aechmea 'Pacifica'
 × Neomea 'Flame'

References

External links
Aechmea distichantha
Aechmea distichantha

distichantha
Flora of South America
Plants described in 1853
Garden plants